The Davidson Wildcats wrestling team represents Davidson College of Davidson, North Carolina in NCAA Division I wrestling. The Wildcats are associate members of the Southern Conference since their primary conference, the Atlantic Ten Conference does not sponsor the sport.

The squad is coached by Andy Lausier. Ty Eustice (Iowa) is head assistant coach and Chad Walsh (Rider) is an assistant coach.

The team has had eleven Southern Conference champions, including one in each year from 2013 to 2015. Davidson has never had an All-American wrestler at the NCAA Wrestling Championships.

References

External links
 

 
1920 establishments in North Carolina
Sports clubs established in 1920